

All-time statistical leaders

Individual Blue Jays career records
Batting average: .363 – John Olerud
On-base percentage: .473 – John Olerud
Slugging percentage: .556 – Carlos Delgado
OPS: .949 – Carlos Delgado
Games: 1,450 – Tony Fernández
At bats: 5,470 – Vernon Wells
Runs: 889 – Carlos Delgado
Hits: 1,583 – Tony Fernández
Total bases: 2,786 – Carlos Delgado
Doubles: 343 – Carlos Delgado
Triples: 72 – Tony Fernández
Home runs: 336 – Carlos Delgado
RBI: 1,058 – Carlos Delgado
Walks: 827 – Carlos Delgado
Strikeouts: 1,242 – Carlos Delgado
Stolen bases: 255 – Lloyd Moseby
Caught stealing: 86 – Tony Fernández
Singles: 1,160 – Tony Fernández
Runs created:  1,077 – Carlos Delgado
Extra-base hits: 690 – Carlos Delgado
Times on base: 2,362 – Carlos Delgado
Hit by pitch: 122 – Carlos Delgado
Sacrifice hits:  74 – Alfredo Griffin
Sacrifice flies: 65 – Joe Carter
Intentional walks: 128 – Carlos Delgado
Grounded into double plays:  146 – Vernon Wells
At bats per strikeout:  17.6 – Bob Bailor
At bats per home run:  14.9 – Carlos Delgado

Pitching leaders
Wins: 175 – Dave Stieb
Losses: 140 – Jim Clancy
ERA: 3.42 – Dave Stieb
Strikeouts: 1,658 – Dave Stieb
Walks allowed: 1,020 – Dave Stieb
Games: 505 – Jason Frasor
Games started: 408 – Dave Stieb
IP: 2,873.0 – Dave Stieb
Saves: 217 – Tom Henke
Consecutive saves converted: 31 - Jordan Romano (2021–2022)
Complete games: 103 – Dave Stieb
Shutouts: 30 – Dave Stieb
Hits allowed: 2,545 – Dave Stieb
Home runs allowed: 224 – Dave Stieb
Hit batsmen: 129 – Dave Stieb
Runs allowed: 1,208 – Dave Stieb
Earned runs: 1,091 – Dave Stieb
WHIP: 1.20 – Jimmy Key
Opponents batting average (low): .239 – Dave Stieb
Opponents batting average (high): .269 – Todd Stottlemyre (1988–94)
Balks: 14 – Dave Stieb
Wild pitches: 88 – Juan Guzmán (1991–98)
Stolen bases (allowed): 71 – A. J. Burnett (2006–2008)
Caught stealing: 15 – Josh Towers (2003–2007)
Hold: 90 – Scott Downs (2005–2010)

Defensive leaders (minimum 1,000 total chances)
Total chances: 11,147 – 1B/C/OF Carlos Delgado
Putouts: 10,333 – 1B/C/OF Carlos Delgado
Assists: 3,723 – SS/3B Tony Fernández
Errors: 187 – SS/2B/3B Alfredo Griffin (1979–84, 1992–93)
Double plays turned: 1,044 – 1B/C/OF Carlos Delgado
Passed balls: 62 – C Ernie Whitt (1977–89)
Fielding percentage (high): .995 – 1B John Olerud
Fielding percentage (low): .951 – 1B/3B/C Ed Sprague
Stolen bases (allowed): 300 – Gregg Zaun (2004–2008)
Caught stealing: 88 – Gregg Zaun (2004–2008)

Individual Blue Jays single-season records
Offensive leaders
Batting average: .363 – John Olerud (1993)
Hits: 215 – Vernon Wells (2003)
Home runs: 54 – José Bautista (2010)
Grand slams: 4 –Lourdes Gurriel Jr. (2021)
On-base percentage: .473 – John Olerud (1993)
Slugging percentage: .664 – Carlos Delgado (2000)
On-base plus slugging (OPS): 1.134 – Carlos Delgado (2000)
Runs: 134 – Shawn Green (1999)
RBIs: 145 – Carlos Delgado (2003)
Walks: 132 – José Bautista (2011)
Intentional walks: 33 – John Olerud (1993)
Stolen bases: 60 – Dave Collins (1984)
Singles: 161 – Tony Fernández (1986)
Doubles: 57 – Carlos Delgado (2000)
Triples: 17 – Tony Fernández (1990)
Extra base hits: 99 – Carlos Delgado (2000)
Most games: 163 – Tony Fernández (1986)
Most at bats: 687 – Tony Fernández (1986)
Most pinch hits: 16 – Tony Fernández (2001)
Most strikeouts: 170 – José Bautista (2017)
Fewest strikeouts (regular starter): 21 – Bob Bailor (1978)
Hit by pitch: 22 – Shea Hillenbrand (2005)
Longest hitting streak: 28 games – Shawn Green (1999)
Home runs before the All-Star Break: 31 – José Bautista (2011)
Home runs in a single month: 16 – Edwin Encarnación (May 2014)
RBIs in a single month: 35 – Edwin Encarnación (August 2015), Josh Donaldson (August 2015)
Walk-off home runs: 3 – Josh Donaldson (2015)

Most consecutive multi-hit games: 11 Lourdes Gurriel Jr. (2018)
Most consecutive games with a home run: 7 - Kendrys Morales (2018)
Home Runs by a middle infielder: 38 - Marcus Semien (2021)

Pitching leaders
Wins (starter): 22 – Roy Halladay (2003)
Wins (reliever): 14 – Mark Eichhorn (1986)
Lowest ERA: 2.05 – Roger Clemens (1997)²
Strikeouts: 292 – Roger Clemens (1997)
Most decisions: 31 – Dave Stieb (1982)
Most starts: 40 – Jim Clancy (1982)
Complete games: 19 – Dave Stieb (1982)
Shutouts: 5 – Dave Stieb (1982)
Innings pitched (starter): 288.1 – Dave Stieb (1982)
Hits allowed: 278 – Dave Lemanczyk (1977)
Earned runs allowed: 129 – Erik Hanson (1996)
Runs allowed: 143 – Erik Hanson (1996), Dave Lemanczyk (1977)
Home runs allowed: 36 – Woody Williams (1998)
Walks: 128 – Jim Clancy (1980)
Hit batsmen: 16 – Chris Carpenter (2001)
Wild pitches: 26 – Juan Guzmán (1993)
Balks: 6 – Mark Eichhorn (1988)
Most appearances: 89 – Mark Eichhorn (1987)
Saves: 45 – Duane Ward (1993)
Consecutive saves converted: 25 – Tom Henke (1991)
Games finished: 70 – Duane Ward (1993)
Wins (relief): 14 – Mark Eichhorn (1987)
Innings pitched (relief): 157.0 – Mark Eichhorn (1986)
Longest win streak: 15 – Roger Clemens (1998), Roy Halladay (2003)
Longest losing streak: 13 – Ricky Romero (2012)
Best start: 11 wins 0 losses – Roger Clemens (1997 – starter), Dennis Lamp (1985 – relief)
Most consecutive batters faced without surrendering a hit: 43 Brett Cecil (2013)

Fielding leaders
Errors: 37 – Alfredo Griffin (SS) (1980)

Individual Blue Jays single-game records
Offensive leaders
Most at-bats: 9 – Alfredo Griffin (October 4, 1980 vs. Boston Red Sox) (17 inning game), Jose Reyes (August 10, 2014 vs. Detroit Tigers) (19 inning game)
Most at-bats (9 inning game): 7 – Ben Revere (September 30, 2015 vs. Baltimore Orioles)
Most runs scored: 5 – 5 tied for lead, most recently Lourdes Gurriel Jr. (September 12, 2021 vs. Baltimore Orioles)
Most hits: 6 – Frank Catalanotto (May 1, 2004 vs. Chicago White Sox), Lourdes Gurriel Jr. (July 22, 2022 vs. Boston Red Sox)
Most doubles: 4 – Dámaso García (June 27, 1986 vs. New York Yankees), Shannon Stewart (July 18, 2000 vs. New York Mets), Alex Ríos (August 17, 2008 vs. Boston Red Sox)
Most triples: 2 – 11 tied for lead, most recently Alex Ríos (April 27, 2005 vs. Tampa Bay Devil Rays)
Most home runs: 4 – Carlos Delgado (Sept 25, 2003 vs. Tampa Bay Devil Rays)
Most total bases: 16 – Carlos Delgado (Sept 25, 2003 vs. Tampa Bay Devil Rays)
Most RBI: 9 – Roy Howell (Sept 10, 1977 vs. New York Yankees), Edwin Encarnación (August 29, 2015 vs. Detroit Tigers)
Most strikeouts: 6 – Alex Gonzalez (Sept 9, 1998 vs. Cleveland Indians)
Most walks: 5 – Melky Cabrera (August 10, 2014 vs. Detroit Tigers)
Most stolen bases: 4 – Dámaso García (April 25, 1984 vs. Oakland Athletics), Dave Collins (August 5, 1984 vs. Baltimore Orioles), Roberto Alomar (June 8, 1991 vs. Baltimore Orioles), Otis Nixon (August 14, 1996 vs. Boston Red Sox), Rajai Davis (July 28, 2013 vs. Houston Astros)
Most hit-by-pitch: 3 – Reed Johnson (April 16, 2005 vs. Texas Rangers), (April 7, 2006 vs. Tampa Bay Devil Rays), (April 29, 2006 vs. New York Yankees)
Most times-on-base: 8 – Melky Cabrera (August 10, 2014 vs. Detroit Tigers)

Pitching leaders
Most innings: 12 – Jesse Jefferson (May 23, 1978 vs. Boston Red Sox), Dave Stieb (May 17, 1980 vs. Oakland Athletics)
Most innings (reliever): 7.1 – Mike Willis (Sept 27, 1977 vs. Boston Red Sox)
Most hits: 14 – Josh Towers (May 27, 2005 vs. Minnesota Twins)
Most runs: 13 – David Wells (August 20, 1992 vs. Milwaukee Brewers)
Most earned runs: 13 -	David Wells (August 20, 1992 vs. Milwaukee Brewers)
Most unearned runs: 10	- Dave Stewart (May 19, 1993 vs. Boston Red Sox)
Most home runs: 5 – Pat Hentgen (twice) (May 26, 1995 vs. Cleveland Indians), (June 25, 1997 vs. Boston Red Sox)
Most strikeouts: 18 – Roger Clemens (August 25, 1998 vs. Kansas City Royals)
Most walks: 9 – Jesse Jefferson (June 18, 1977 vs. Baltimore Orioles), Jim Clancy (August 30, 1984 vs. Chicago White Sox), Tom Candiotti (August 8, 1991 vs. Detroit Tigers), Pat Hentgen (July 15, 1995 vs. Seattle Mariners), Chris Carpenter (August 16, 1999 vs. Seattle Mariners)
Most hit batsmen: 3 – David Wells (April 12, 1992 vs. Baltimore Orioles), Chris Michalak (June 6, 2001 vs. Tampa Bay Devil Rays), Mark Buehrle (October 2, 2015 vs. Tampa Bay Rays)
Most wild pitches: 4 – John Cerutti (July 3, 1986 vs. Boston Red Sox)
Most strikeouts by a pitcher in his Blue Jays debut: 11 – David Price (August 3, 2015 vs Minnesota Twins)

All-time team records

Single-season team records
Offensive leaders
Batting average: .284 (2006)
On-base percentage: .352 (1999)
Home runs: 257 (2010)
Hits: 1,580 (1999, 2003)
RBIs: 856 (1999)
Stolen bases: 193 (1984)
Strikeouts: 1,251 (2012)
Walks: 588 (1993)
Doubles: 357 (2003)
Triples: 68 (1984)
Extra base hits: 597 (2010)
Runs: 894 (2003)

Pitching leaders
Lowest ERA: 3.29 (1985)
Highest ERA: 5.14 (2000)
Most strikeouts: 1,184 (2008, 2010)
Fewest strikeouts: 611 (1979)
Most walks: 654 (1995)
Fewest walks: 445 (1990)
Most hits: 1,615 (2000)
Fewest hits: 1,301 (1991)
Most home runs: 204 (2012)
Fewest home runs: 99 (1989)
Most hit batsmen: 77 (2011)
Fewest hit batsmen: 20 (1977)
Most wild pitches: 83 (1993)
Fewest wild pitches: 25 (1983)
Most wins by a duo: 38 – Roy Halladay (20-11) and A. J. Burnett (18-10) (2008)

Single-game team records
Offensive leaders
Most runs: 28 (July 22, 2022 vs. Boston Red Sox)
Most runs in an inning: 11 (two times: September 11, 2021 vs. Baltimore Orioles, 7th inning; July 22, 2022 vs. Boston Red Sox, 5th inning)
Most hits: 29 (July 22, 2022 vs. Boston Red Sox)
Most singles: 17 (three times, most recently: August 24, 1997 vs. Kansas City)
Most doubles: 10 (August 17, 2008 vs. Boston Red Sox)
Most triples: 4 (three times, most recently: July 5, 1984 vs. Seattle Mariners)
Most home runs: 10 (September 14, 1987 vs. Baltimore Orioles)
Most total bases: 53 (September 14, 1987 vs. Baltimore Orioles)
Most RBIs: 28 (July 22, 2022 vs. Boston Red Sox)
Most extra base hits: 12 (three times, most recently: August 17, 2008 vs. Boston Red Sox)
Most strikeouts: 22 (August 1, 2016 vs. Houston Astros, 14 inning game)
Most walks: 14 (August 10, 2014 vs. Detroit Tigers, 19 inning game) 
Most stolen bases: 7 (August 5, 1984 vs. Baltimore Orioles)
Most sacrifice hits: 4 (two times, most recently: August 14, 1990 vs. Chicago White Sox)
Most sacrifice flies: 4 (three times, most recently: June 11, 2016 vs. Baltimore Orioles)
Most hit by pitch: 4 (two times, most recently: July 19, 2003 vs. Baltimore Orioles)
Most ground into double play (GIDP): 6 (two times:  August 29, 1977 vs. Minnesota Twins), (August 30, 2009 vs. Kansas City Royals)
Best shutout victory: 15-0 (July 6, 1996 vs. Detroit Tigers)
Worst shutout defeat: 0-16 (July 25, 2012 vs. Oakland Athletics)
Best winning margin: 23 (July 22, 2022 vs. Boston Red Sox)
Worst losing margin: 22 (two times, most recently: September 28, 2000 vs. Baltimore Orioles)
Most consecutive games, one or more HRs: 23 games (44 home runs) May 31 – June 25, 2000
Most consecutive games, one or more HRs at home: 22 (May 31 – July 23, 2000)
Most consecutive games, no home runs: 10 (three times, most recently: September 20 – October 1, 1995)
Most consecutive strikeouts, batters: 7 (May 25, 2001 vs. Boston Red Sox)
Most consecutive strikeouts, batters to start a game: 6 (July 26, 2000 vs. Cleveland Indians)

Pitching leaders
Most runs allowed: 24 (August 25, 1979 vs. California Angels)
Most earned runs: 22 (August 28, 1992 vs. Milwaukee Brewers)
Most unearned runs: 13	(September 28, 2000 vs. Baltimore Orioles)
Most hits: 31 (August 28, 1992 vs. Milwaukee Brewers)
Most home runs: 8 (July 4, 1977 vs. Boston Red Sox), (June 20, 2000 vs. Detroit Tigers)
Most strikeouts: 18 (August 25, 1998 vs. Kansas City Royals) – 9 innings
21 (August 8, 1991 vs. Detroit Tigers) – 14 innings
Most walks: 14 (September 9, 1979 vs. Cleveland Indians) – 9 innings
16 (May 9, 2002 vs. Seattle Mariners) – 11 innings
Most wild pitches: 4 (5 times, most recently: September 10, 2004 vs. Texas Rangers)
Most hit batsmen: 5 (May 15, 2017 vs Atlanta Braves)
Longest 1–0 game, won: 12 innings (2 times: September 26, 1986 vs. Boston Red Sox; June 24, 2015 vs. Tampa Bay Rays)
Longest 1–0 game, lost: 15 innings (July 27, 1986 vs. Oakland Athletics)

Organization records
Wins: 99 — 1985
Losses: 109 — 1979
Winning percentage (high): .615 — 1985
Winning percentage (low): .327 — 1979
Most games back: 50.5 — 1979
Division titles: 6 — 1985, 1989, 1991–93, 2015
American League Pennants: 2 — 1992–93
World Championships: 2 — 1992–93
Attendance – season (high): 4,057,947 — 1993
Attendance – season (low): 755,083 — 1981
Attendance – game (high): 52,268 — October 22, 1992
Attendance – game (low): 10,074 — April 17, 1979
Longest game by innings:
August 10, 2014 — 6-5 win over the Detroit Tigers in 19 innings at home
July 1, 2016 — 2-1 loss to Cleveland Indians in 19 innings at home.
September 5, 2017 — 3-2 loss to the Boston Red Sox in 19 innings on the road.
Longest nine inning game by time: 4:23 — September 6, 2020 — 10-8 win over the Boston Red Sox
Longest game by time: 6:37 — August 10, 2014 — 6–5 win over the Detroit Tigers in 19 innings at home.
Longest winning streak: 11 games (five times) — June 2–13, 1987; August 27-September 7, 1998; June 11–24, 2013; June 2–14, 2015; August 2–13, 2015

Rare feats
Back-to-Back World Series Wins: 1992 (vs. Atlanta Braves) – 1993 (vs. Philadelphia Phillies)
Walk-Off Home Run to win World Series: Joe Carter vs. Philadelphia Phillies (October 23, 1993) (Blue Jays lead 3 Games to 2) (Game 6, Bottom of 9th Inning, Trailing 6-5, 1 Out, 2-2 Count, Rickey Henderson and Paul Molitor on base)
Longest Opening Day game in MLB history: 16 innings vs. Cleveland Indians (April 5, 2012)
Triple Crown (pitching): Roger Clemens – 1997 (21 W, 2.05 ERA, 292 K) & 1998 (20 W, 2.65 ERA, 271 K)
No-Hitter: Dave Stieb vs. Cleveland Indians (September 2, 1990)
Cycles: Kelly Gruber vs. Kansas City Royals (Apr. 16, 1989), Jeff Frye vs. Texas Rangers (Aug. 17, 2001), Cavan Biggio vs Baltimore Orioles (Sept. 17, 2019)
Six Hits in One Game: Frank Catalanotto vs. Chicago White Sox (May 1, 2004), Lourdes Gurriel Jr. vs. Boston Red Sox (July 22, 2022)
Four Home Runs in One Game: Carlos Delgado vs. Tampa Bay Devil Rays (September 25, 2003)
Ten team home runs in one game: Ernie Whitt (3), Rance Mulliniks (2), George Bell (2), Fred McGriff, Lloyd Moseby and Rob Ducey vs. Baltimore Orioles (September 14, 1987)
Reliever striking out the side in extra innings with bases loaded: Jesse Carlson vs. Texas Rangers (April 16, 2008) – Top of 11th inning. Overall result – Blue Jays loss (7-5 in the 14th)
Four strikeouts in one extra inning: Steve Delabar vs. Chicago White Sox (August 13, 2012) – Top of 10th inning. Overall result – Blue Jays win (3–2 in the 11th), Mike Bolsinger vs. Boston Red Sox (July 18, 2017) – Bottom of 13th inning. Overall result – Blue Jays loss (5–4 in the 15th)
50-home run season: José Bautista (2010 season, season total 54)
Back-to-back-to-back triples: Eric Thames, Rajai Davis, Jayson Nix vs. Cleveland Indians (June 1, 2011)
Triple play: 4 times:  Latest vs. Kansas City Royals April 20, 2012 (bottom of 3rd inning)
Two home runs in One inning: 2 times: Joe Carter (1993), Edwin Encarnación (2013)
Immaculate Inning: Roger Clemens (September 18, 1997), Steve Delabar (July 30, 2013), Thomas Pannone (April 14, 2019)
First time in the MLB two home runs by two Canadians in the same inning: Russell Martin & Michael Saunders May 25, 2016 vs. New York Yankees
Two Walk-Off Grand Slams in One Season: Steve Pearce – July 27, 2017 vs. Oakland Athletics and July 30, 2017 vs. Los Angeles Angels (also first MLB player to hit two walk-off grand slams within a single week)
Ultimate Grand Slam: Steve Pearce July 30, 2017 vs. Los Angeles Angels
Most strikeouts in 1000 innings pitched: Robbie Ray - 1241 k's - August 30, 2021 vs. Baltimore Orioles
4 home runs scored in one inning: September 12, 2021 vs Baltimore Orioles
11 runs scored in an inning: five times – July 20, 1984 vs Seattle Mariners, 9th inning; April 26, 1995 vs Oakland Athletics, 2nd inning; July 25, 2007 vs Minnesota Twins, 6th inning; September 11, 2021 vs Baltimore Orioles, 7th inning; July 22, 2022 vs Boston Red Sox, 5th inning
Four grand slams in a season: Lourdes Gurriel Jr. – June 24, 2021 vs Baltimore Orioles; July 18, 2021 vs. Texas Rangers; September 3, 2021 vs Oakland Athletics; September 12, 2021 vs Baltimore Orioles

Club firsts
Game & win: April 7, 1977 – Toronto 9, Chicago 5 at Exhibition Stadium
Batter: John Scott – April 7, 1977
Pitcher: Bill Singer – April 7, 1977
Home run: Doug Ault vs. Chicago White Sox – April 7, 1977
Grand slam: Héctor Torres vs. New York Yankees – June 27, 1977
Win: Jerry Johnson – April 7, 1977
Save: Pete Vuckovich vs. Chicago White Sox – April 7, 1977
Walk-off win: July 15, 1977 – Toronto 8, Detroit 6 (13 innings)
Walk-off grand slam (regulation play): George Bell – September 4, 1988
Walk-off grand slam (extra innings): Gregg Zaun vs. Tampa Bay – September 6, 2008 – Toronto 7, Tampa Bay 4 (13 innings)
Ultimate grand slam: Steve Pearce vs. Los Angeles Angels – July 30, 2017
Cy Young Award: Pat Hentgen – 1996
2-season 20-game winner: Roger Clemens – 1997/1998
AL strikeout leader: Roger Clemens – 1997 (292)
Gold Glove winner: Tony Fernández (Shortstop, 1986), Jesse Barfield (Outfield, 1986), Kelly Gruber (Third base, 1990), Roberto Alomar (Second base, 1991), R. A. Dickey (Pitcher, 2013)
Silver Slugger winner: Dámaso García – 1982
AL MVP: George Bell – 1987
Hank Aaron Award: Carlos Delgado – 2000
Rookie of the Year:  Alfredo Griffin – 1979
Manager of the Year: Bobby Cox – 1985
First 20-game winner for a pitcher: Jack Morris – 1992
First player with back-to-back 40-home-run seasons: Carlos Delgado – 1999/2000
First player to lead the majors in All-Star voting: José Bautista (7,454,753 votes) – 2011

Note
¹Henke is team's save leader; but has only 563 IP
²minimum 162 innings pitched must be pitched (1 inning pitched per game played).
Slugger Awards were first given out in 1980

References

External links
Bluejays.com
baseball-reference.com batting leaders
baseball-reference.com pitching leaders

Records
Toronto Blue Jays